The Purple Rose of Cairo is a 1985 American fantasy romantic comedy film written and directed by Woody Allen, and starring Mia Farrow, Jeff Daniels, and Danny Aiello. Inspired by the films Sherlock Jr. (1924) and Hellzapoppin' (1941) and Pirandello's play Six Characters in Search of an Author, it is the tale of a film character named Tom Baxter who leaves a fictional film of the same name and enters the real world.

The film was released on March 1, 1985. It won the BAFTA Award for Best Film, while Allen received several screenwriting nominations, including at the Academy Awards, the BAFTA Awards, and the Writers Guild of America Awards. Allen has ranked it among his best films, along with Husbands and Wives (1992) and Match Point (2005).

Plot
In 1935 New Jersey during the Great Depression, Cecilia is a clumsy waitress who goes to the movies to escape her bleak life and loveless, abusive marriage to Monk, whom she has attempted to leave on numerous occasions.

The latest film Cecilia sees is a fictional RKO film, The Purple Rose of Cairo. It is the story of a rich Manhattan playwright named Henry who goes on an exotic vacation to Egypt with companions Jason and Rita. While in Egypt, the three meet archaeologist Tom Baxter. Tom is brought back for a "madcap Manhattan weekend" where he falls head-over-heels for Kitty Haynes, a chanteuse at the Copacabana.

After Cecilia sits through the film several times, Tom, noticing her, breaks the fourth wall, and emerges from the inner film's black-and-white world into the full-color real world on the other side of the cinema screen. He tells Cecilia that he is attracted to her after noticing her watching him so many times, and she takes him around her New Jersey town. Later, he takes her into the film and they have a great evening in the town within the film. The two fall in love. But between these two events, the character's defection from the film has caused some problems. In other copies of the film, others have tried to exit the screen. The producer of the film learns that Tom has left the film, and he flies cross-country to New Jersey with actor Gil Shepherd (the "real life" actor playing the part of Tom in the movie). This sets up an unusual love triangle involving Tom, Gil, and Cecilia. Cecilia must choose between them and she decides to choose the real person of Gil rather than the fantasy figure of Tom. She gives up the chance to return with Tom to his world, choosing to stay with Gil and have a "real" life. Then she finally leaves her husband.

But Gil's professions of love for Cecilia were false—he wooed her only to get Tom to return to the movie and thereby save his own Hollywood career. Gil abandons Cecilia and is seen quietly racked with guilt on his flight back to Hollywood. Having been left without a lover, job, or home, Cecilia ends up immersing herself in the frothy escapism of Hollywood once again by going to the movies. Cecilla sits by herself in the theater watching Fred Astaire and Ginger Rogers dance to "Cheek to Cheek" in Top Hat, ultimately losing herself in the charm of the film.

Cast

Michael Keaton was originally cast as Tom Baxter/Gil Shepherd, as Allen was a fan of his work. Allen later felt that Keaton, who took a pay cut to work with the director, was too contemporary and hard to accept in the period role. The two amicably parted ways after ten days of filming and Daniels replaced Keaton in the role.

Production
Several scenes featuring Tom and Cecilia are set at the Bertrand Island Amusement Park, which closed just prior to the film's production. Many of the outside scenes were filmed in Piermont, New York, a village on the Hudson River about 15 miles north of the George Washington Bridge. Store fronts had false facades reflecting the depression-era setting. It was also filmed at the Raritan Diner in South Amboy, New Jersey. Woody Allen shut down the Kent Theater on Coney Island Avenue in Brooklyn, the neighborhood he grew up in, to film there.

In a rare public appearance at the National Film Theatre in 2001, Woody Allen listed The Purple Rose of Cairo as one of only a few of his films that ended up being "fairly close to what I wanted to do" when he set out to write it. Allen provided more detail about the film's origins in a comment he made a year earlier, during a press junket for Small Time Crooks:

Reception

Box office
In its opening weekend, The Purple Rose of Cairo earned $114,095 from three theaters in the United States and Canada. Its total gross in the United States and Canada was $10,631,333.

Critical response
On the review aggregator website Rotten Tomatoes, The Purple Rose of Cairo holds an approval rating of 93%, based on 40 reviews, with an average score of 8/10. The website's critics consensus reads, "Lighthearted and sweet, The Purple Rose of Cairo stands as one of Woody Allen's more inventive—and enchantingly whimsical—pictures." The film also holds a score of 75 out of 100 on Metacritic, based on seven critics, indicating "generally favorable reviews."

Roger Ebert of the Chicago Sun-Times gave the film four out of four stars, writing, "The Purple Rose of Cairo is audacious and witty and has a lot of good laughs in it, but the best thing about the movie is the way Woody Allen uses it to toy with the very essence of reality and fantasy." Time Out also gave the film favorable appraisal, saying "the star-struck couple, Farrow and Daniels, work wonders with fantastic emotions, while Allen's direction invests enough care, wit and warmth to make it genuinely moving." Vincent Canby of The New York Times wrote some of the most glowing contemporary praise, saying, "My admiration for Mr. Allen extends to everyone connected with The Purple Rose of Cairo—all of the actors, including Mr. Daniels, Mr. Aiello, Dianne Wiest and the players within the film within; Stuart Wurtzel, the production designer, and particularly Gordon Willis, the director of photography, who has great fun imitating the look of the movie Cecilia falls in love with, as well as in creating a style fitting to the depressed times that frame the interior film." Canby concluded, stating, "I'll go out on a limb: I can't believe the year will bring forth anything to equal The Purple Rose of Cairo. At 84 minutes, it's short but nearly every one of those minutes is blissful."

Accolades

The film was recognized as one of the "All-Time 100 Best Films" by Time magazine.

American Film Institute Lists
 AFI's 100 Years...100 Laughs – Nominated
 AFI's 100 Years...100 Passions – Nominated
 AFI's 10 Top 10 – Nominated Fantasy Film

Legacy
In 1991, Jeff Daniels founded the Purple Rose Theatre Company in his hometown of Chelsea, Michigan. The theatre takes its name from The Purple Rose of Cairo.

Soundtrack
 "Cheek to Cheek" (1935) – written by Irving Berlin; vocals by Fred Astaire
 "I Love My Baby, My Baby Loves Me" (1925) – music by Harry Warren; sung by Jeff Daniels with Loretta Tupper on piano
 "Alabamy Bound" (1925) – music by Ray Henderson; played by Cynthia Sayer; sung by Jeff Daniels
 "One Day at a Time" – written by Dick Hyman; sung by Karen Akers

References

External links
 
 
 
 
 
 Roller coasters, Aristotle, and the films of Woody Allen. a 2001 article from the Literature Film Quarterly
 Woody Allen 2001 interview at the National Film Theatre

1985 films
1985 romantic comedy films
1980s American films
1980s English-language films
1980s fantasy comedy films
1980s romantic fantasy films
American fantasy comedy films
American romantic comedy films
American romantic fantasy films
Best Film BAFTA Award winners
Best Foreign Film César Award winners
Films about fandom
Films about films
Films directed by Woody Allen
Films partially in color
Films produced by Robert Greenhut
Films set in 1935
Films set in a movie theatre
Films set in New Jersey
Films shot in New Jersey
Films shot in New York (state)
Films whose writer won the Best Original Screenplay BAFTA Award
Films with screenplays by Woody Allen
Great Depression films
Magic realism films
Orion Pictures films
Self-reflexive films